The S3W reactor is a naval reactor used by the United States Navy to provide electricity generation and propulsion on warships.  The S3W designation stands for:

 S = Submarine platform
 3 = Third generation core designed by the contractor
 W = Westinghouse was the contracted designer

Design 
The S3W plant utilized horizontal U-tube steam generators. This concept developed into vertical U-tube steam generators in the S5W reactor plant, and is in common use today on commercial PWR power plants.

History 
USS Swordfish and  USS Seadragon had the S3W reactor installed in the S4W reactor plant, which was an alternate arrangement of the same components.

References 

 

United States naval reactors
Pressurized water reactors